Gerard "Pummy" Bergholtz (born 29 August 1939 in Maastricht) is a retired association football player and manager from the Netherlands.

Playing career

Club
He played for Rapid, Kimbria Maastricht, MVV and Feijenoord, before moving abroad to play in Belgium for  Anderlecht (where he played alongside fellow Dutch international Jan Mulder), Royal Racing White, RWDM and Mons.

International
Bergholtz made his debut for the Netherlands in an April 1961 FIFA World Cup qualification match against Hungary an earned a total of 12 caps, scoring no goals. His final international was a May 1967 European Championship qualification match, also against Hungary.

Managerial career
After retiring as a player, he coached Belgian clubs Lanaken, Bilzen, STVV, Patro Eisden, Diest and AA Gent.

References

External links
 

1939 births
Living people
Footballers from Maastricht
Association football midfielders
Dutch footballers
Netherlands international footballers
MVV Maastricht players
Feyenoord players
R.S.C. Anderlecht players
R.W.D. Molenbeek players
R.A.E.C. Mons players
Eredivisie players
Belgian Pro League players
Dutch expatriate footballers
Expatriate footballers in Belgium
Dutch expatriate sportspeople in Belgium
Dutch football managers
Sint-Truidense V.V. managers
K. Patro Eisden Maasmechelen managers
K.A.A. Gent managers
Expatriate football managers in Belgium
K.F.C. Diest managers
Dutch expatriate football managers